Basti Babbar is a town of Bahawalpur District in the Punjab province of eastern Pakistan. 

Populated places in Bahawalpur District